Kostilkovo is a village in the municipality of Ivaylovgrad, in Haskovo Province, in southern Bulgaria. It was known as "Çekirdekli" during Ottoman rule

References

Villages in Haskovo Province